Psusennes III was the High Priest of Amun at Thebes (976 – 943 BC) at the end of the 21st Dynasty. Little is known of this individual; he is thought by some to be the same person as pharaoh Psusennes II. His name appears on a document found at the 'mummy cache' DB320, which describes him as a son of the High Priest Pinedjem II. This makes him a possible candidate for Psusennes II because Pinedjem II died in Year 10 of Siamun, who was the immediate predecessor of this pharaoh.

References

Theban High Priests of Amun
People of the Twenty-first Dynasty of Egypt
10th-century BC clergy